Gary Will is a Canadian professional wrestling historian and writer.

Career
Will is best known for writing the book Wrestling Title Histories, which is widely regarded as the most complete compilation of championship listings for professional wrestling. Many wrestling fans refer to it as a "Bible". He wrote a listing of deceased professional wrestlers, as noted on various websites. He is also known for his "Canadian Pro Wrestling Page of Fame", which honored professional wrestlers who are Canadian citizens, as opposed to the "Canadian Wrestling Hall of Fame", which honored any wrestler or wrestling associated person who made landmark contributions for wrestling in Canada.

Works

See also
 List of professional wrestling halls of fame
 List of professional wrestling magazines

References

External links
 Website

Living people
Professional wrestling historians
20th-century Canadian historians
Year of birth missing (living people)